The 2018 season was Surrey Stars' third season, in which they competed in the Women's Cricket Super League, a Twenty20 competition. The side finished third in the group stage, winning 5 of their 10 matches, therefore progressing to the semi-final, where they played against Western Storm. They went on to beat Storm by 9 runs to advance to the final, where they faced group winners Loughborough Lightning. A century from Lizelle Lee ensured that the Stars beat Loughborough Lightning by 66 runs to claim their first WCSL title.

The side was captained by Nat Sciver and coached by Richard Bedbrook. They played three of their home matches at Woodbridge Road, Guildford and two at The Oval.

Squad
Surrey Stars' 15-player squad is listed below. Ellen Burt was originally named in the squad, but was ruled out due to injury and replaced by Gayatri Gole. Grace Gibbs was ruled out of the squad during the tournament due to injury, and replaced by Amy Gordon. Age given is at the start of Surrey Stars' first match of the season (22 July 2018).

Women's Cricket Super League

Season standings

 Advanced to the Final.
 Advanced to the Semi-final.

League stage

Semi-final

Final

Statistics

Batting

Bowling

Fielding

Wicket-keeping

References

Surrey Stars seasons
2018 in English women's cricket